2014 lunar eclipse may refer to:

 April 2014 lunar eclipse
 October 2014 lunar eclipse